Nathan Adams (born 16 July 1996), known professionally as Nafe Smallz, is a British rapper, singer and songwriter from Luton, Bedfordshire. He took the UK trap scene by storm with the song "What Do You Mean" on Link Up TV. He’s also signed to OZONE Music and released Mixtapes such as Movie Music and Goat World. He has worked with artists like Chip, M Huncho and D-Block Europe.

Discography

Mixtapes

Extended plays

Singles

As lead artist

As featured artist

Other certified songs

Other guest appearances

Personal life
He is a supporter of Arsenal F.C.

References

Living people
People from Luton
English male rappers
British trap musicians
1996 births